The 2020 Youngstown State Penguins baseball team was a baseball team that represented Youngstown State University in the 2020 NCAA Division I baseball season. The Penguins were members of the Horizon League and played their home games at Eastwood Field in Niles, Ohio. They were led by fourth-year head coach Dan Bertolini.

The season was cut short in stages by March 17 due to the COVID-19 pandemic.

Previous season
The Penguins finished the 2019 NCAA Division I baseball season 13–41 overall (7–20 conference) and sixth place in conference standings, qualifying for the 2019 Horizon League baseball tournament.

Roster

Schedule

! style="" | Regular Season
|- valign="top" 

|- bgcolor="#ffcccc"
| 1 || February 14 || at  || Schroeder Park • Houston, Texas, || 3–7 || Hurdsman (1–0) || Clark (0–1) || None || 1,074 || 0–1 || –
|- bgcolor="#ccffcc"
| 2 || February 15 || at Houston || Schroeder Park • Houston, Texas || 6–3 || Clift Jr. (1–0) || Henry (0–1) || Hake (1) || 1,128 || 1–1 || –
|- bgcolor="#ccffcc"
| 3 || February 16 || at Houston || Schroeder Park • Houston, Texas || 8–6 || Earich (1–0) || Hynes (0–1) || None || 1,047 || 2–1 || –
|- bgcolor="#ffcccc"
| 4 || February 21 || at  || CofC Baseball Stadium at Patriots Point • Mount Pleasant, South Carolina, || 4–5 || Good (1–0) || Hake (0–1) || None || 473 || 2–2 || –
|- bgcolor="#ffcccc"
| 5 || February 22 || at College of Charleston || CofC Baseball Stadium at Patriots Point • Mount Pleasant, South Carolina || 4–14 || Smith (2–0) || Floyd (0–1) || None || 542 || 2–3 || –
|- bgcolor="#ffcccc"
| 6 || February 23 || at College of Charleston || CofC Baseball Stadium at Patriots Point • Mount Pleasant, South Carolina || 3–7 || Williams (1–0) || Snyder (0–1) || None || 576 || 2–4 || –
|- bgcolor="#ffcccc"
| 7 || February 27 || at  || Crutcher Scott Field • Abilene, Texas, || 2–5 || Wagner (1–1) || Perry (0–1) || None || 333 || 2–5 || –
|- bgcolor="#ccffcc"
| 8 || February 28 || at Abilene Christian || Crutcher Scott Field • Abilene, Texas || 4–2 || Clark (1–1) || Ruesch (1–2) || None || 357 || 3–5 || –
|- bgcolor="#ccffcc"
| 9 || February 29 || at Abilene Christian || Crutcher Scott Field • Abilene, Texas || 9–0 || Floyd (1–1) || Hawkins (1–1) || None || 321 || 4–5 || –
|-

|- bgcolor="#ccffcc"
| 10 || March 4 || at  || Charles L. Cost Field • Pittsburgh, Pennsylvania || 7–5 || Clift Jr. (2–0) || Smith (1–1) || None || 215 || 5–5 || –
|- bgcolor="#ffcccc"
| 11 || March 6 || at  || Durham Athletic Park • Durham, North Carolina, || 5–6 || Meylan (1–0) || Earich (1–1) || Bell (3) || 114 || 5–6 || –
|- bgcolor="#ccffcc"
| 12 || March 7 || at North Carolina Central || Durham Athletic Park • Durham, North Carolina || 3–1 || Floyd (2–1) || McRoy (0–1) || Clift Jr. (1) || 200 || 6–6 || –
|- bgcolor="#ccffcc"
| 13 || March 8 || at North Carolina Central || Durham Athletic Park • Durham, North Carolina || 8–7 || Coles (1–0) || Bell (0–2) || Clift Jr. (2) || 195 || 7–6 || –
|- bgcolor="#ffcccc"
| 14 || March 10 ||  || Eastwood Field • Niles, Ohio, || 1–2 || Stopp (1–1) || Marshalwitz (0–1) || Lohmeier (1) || 161 || 7–7 || –
|- bgcolor="#bbbbbb"
| 15 || March 13 || at  || Bill Aker Baseball Complex • Highland Heights, Kentucky, || colspan=7| Canceled (COVID-19 pandemic)
|- bgcolor="#bbbbbb"
| 16 || March 14 || at Northern Kentucky || Bill Aker Baseball Complex • Highland Heights, Kentucky || colspan=7| Canceled (COVID-19 pandemic)
|- bgcolor="#bbbbbb"
| 17 || March 15 || at Northern Kentucky || Bill Aker Baseball Complex • Highland Heights, Kentucky || colspan=7| Canceled (COVID-19 pandemic)
|- bgcolor="#bbbbbb"
| 18 || March 17 || at  || Scott Park Baseball Complex • Toledo, Ohio, || colspan=7| Canceled (COVID-19 pandemic)
|- bgcolor="#bbbbbb"
| 19 || March 18 ||  || Eastwood Field • Niles, Ohio || colspan=7| Canceled (COVID-19 pandemic)
|- bgcolor="#bbbbbb"
| 20 || March 20 || at  || Routine Field • Franklin, Wisconsin || colspan=7| Canceled (COVID-19 pandemic)
|- bgcolor="#bbbbbb"
| 21 || March 21 || at Milwaukee || Routine Field • Franklin, Wisconsin || colspan=7| Canceled (COVID-19 pandemic)
|- bgcolor="#bbbbbb"
| 22 || March 22 || at Milwaukee || Routine Field • Franklin, Wisconsin || colspan=7| Canceled (COVID-19 pandemic)
|- bgcolor="#bbbbbb"
| 23 || March 25 || at Pittsburgh || Charles L. Cost Field • Pittsburgh, Pennsylvania || colspan=7| Canceled (COVID-19 pandemic)
|- bgcolor="#bbbbbb"
| 24 || March 27 ||  || Eastwood Field • Niles, Ohio || colspan=7| Canceled (COVID-19 pandemic)
|- bgcolor="#bbbbbb"
| 25 || March 28 || UIC || Eastwood Field • Niles, Ohio || colspan=7| Canceled (COVID-19 pandemic)
|- bgcolor="#bbbbbb"
| 26 || March 29 || UIC || Eastwood Field • Niles, Ohio || colspan=7| Canceled (COVID-19 pandemic)
|- bgcolor="#bbbbbb"
| 27 || March 31 ||  || Eastwood Field • Niles, Ohio || colspan=7| Canceled (COVID-19 pandemic)
|-

|- bgcolor="#bbbbbb"
| 28 || April 3 || at  || Nischwitz Stadium • Dayton, Ohio, || colspan=7| Canceled (COVID-19 pandemic)
|- bgcolor="#bbbbbb"
| 29 || April 4 || at Wright State || Nischwitz Stadium • Dayton, Ohio || colspan=7| Canceled (COVID-19 pandemic)
|- bgcolor="#bbbbbb"
| 30 || April 5 || at Wright State || Nischwitz Stadium • Dayton, Ohio || colspan=7| Canceled (COVID-19 pandemic)
|- bgcolor="#bbbbbb"
| 31 || April 7 || at  || Bob Wren Stadium • Athens, Ohio, || colspan=7| Canceled (COVID-19 pandemic)
|- bgcolor="#bbbbbb"
| 32 || April 8 || at  || Schoonover Stadium • Kent, Ohio, || colspan=7| Canceled (COVID-19 pandemic)
|- bgcolor="#bbbbbb"
| 33 || April 9 ||  || Eastwood Field • Niles, Ohio || colspan=7| Canceled (COVID-19 pandemic)
|- bgcolor="#bbbbbb"
| 34 || April 10 || Oakland || Eastwood Field • Niles, Ohio || colspan=7| Canceled (COVID-19 pandemic)
|- bgcolor="#bbbbbb"
| 35 || April 11 || Oakland || Eastwood Field • Niles, Ohio || colspan=7| Canceled (COVID-19 pandemic)
|- bgcolor="#bbbbbb"
| 36 || April 14 || at St. Bonaventure || Fred Handler Park • St. Bonaventure, New York, || colspan=7| Canceled (COVID-19 pandemic)
|- bgcolor="#bbbbbb"
| 37 || April 17 || at UIC || Les Miller Field at Curtis Granderson Stadium • Chicago, Illinois || colspan=7| Canceled (COVID-19 pandemic)
|- bgcolor="#bbbbbb"
| 38 || April 18 || at UIC || Les Miller Field at Curtis Granderson Stadium • Chicago, Illinois || colspan=7| Canceled (COVID-19 pandemic)
|- bgcolor="#bbbbbb"
| 39 || April 19 || at UIC || Les Miller Field at Curtis Granderson Stadium • Chicago, Illinois || colspan=7| Canceled (COVID-19 pandemic)
|- bgcolor="#bbbbbb"
| 40 || April 21 || Ohio || Eastwood Field • Niles, Ohio || colspan=7| Canceled (COVID-19 pandemic)
|- bgcolor="#bbbbbb"
| 41 || April 22 || at Niagara || John P. Bobo Field • Lewiston, New York, || colspan=7| Canceled (COVID-19 pandemic)
|- bgcolor="#bbbbbb"
| 42 || April 24 || Northern Kentucky|| Eastwood Field • Niles, Ohio || colspan=7| Canceled (COVID-19 pandemic)
|- bgcolor="#bbbbbb"
| 43 || April 25 || Northern Kentucky || Eastwood Field • Niles, Ohio || colspan=7| Canceled (COVID-19 pandemic)
|- bgcolor="#bbbbbb"
| 44 || April 26 || Northern Kentucky || Eastwood Field • Niles, Ohio || colspan=7| Canceled (COVID-19 pandemic)
|- bgcolor="#bbbbbb"
| 45 || April 28 || Pittsburgh || Eastwood Field • Niles, Ohio || colspan=7| Canceled (COVID-19 pandemic)
|- bgcolor="#bbbbbb"
| 46 || April 29 || at  || Lee R. Jackson Field • Akron, Ohio, || colspan=7| Canceled (COVID-19 pandemic)
|-

|- bgcolor="#bbbbbb"
| 47 || May 1 || Wright State || Eastwood Field • Niles, Ohio || colspan=7| Canceled (COVID-19 pandemic)
|- bgcolor="#bbbbbb"
| 48 || May 2 || Wright State || Eastwood Field • Niles, Ohio || colspan=7| Canceled (COVID-19 pandemic)
|- bgcolor="#bbbbbb"
| 49 || May 3 || Wright State || Eastwood Field • Niles, Ohio || colspan=7| Canceled (COVID-19 pandemic)
|- bgcolor="#bbbbbb"
| 50 || May 8 || at Oakland || Oakland Baseball Field • Rochester, Michigan, || colspan=7| Canceled (COVID-19 pandemic)
|- bgcolor="#bbbbbb"
| 51 || May 9 || at Oakland || Oakland Baseball Field • Rochester, Michigan || colspan=7| Canceled (COVID-19 pandemic)
|- bgcolor="#bbbbbb"
| 52 || May 10 || at Oakland || Oakland Baseball Field • Rochester, Michigan || colspan=7| Canceled (COVID-19 pandemic)
|- bgcolor="#bbbbbb"
| 53 || May 12 || Kent State || Eastwood Field • Niles, Ohio || colspan=7| Canceled (COVID-19 pandemic)
|- bgcolor="#bbbbbb"
| 54 || May 14 || Milwaukee || Eastwood Field • Niles, Ohio || colspan=7| Canceled (COVID-19 pandemic)
|- bgcolor="#bbbbbb"
| 55 || May 15 || Milwaukee || Eastwood Field • Niles, Ohio || colspan=7| Canceled (COVID-19 pandemic)
|- bgcolor="#bbbbbb"
| 56 || May 16 || Milwaukee || Eastwood Field • Niles, Ohio || colspan=7| Canceled (COVID-19 pandemic)
|-

Awards and honors

Horizon League Players of the Week

References

Youngstown State
Youngstown State Penguins baseball seasons
Ohio